Diogenichthys is a genus of lanternfishes.

Species
There are currently three recognized species in this genus:
 Diogenichthys atlanticus (Tåning, 1928) (Longfin lanternfish)
 Diogenichthys laternatus (Garman, 1899) (Diogenes lanternfish)
 Diogenichthys panurgus Bolin, 1946

References

Myctophidae
Marine fish genera
Taxa named by Rolf Ling Bolin